The Tompkinsville station is a Staten Island Railway station in the neighborhood of Tompkinsville, Staten Island, New York. It is located at Victory Boulevard and Bay Street on the railroad's main line. This is one of two stations on the line that require fare payment to enter or exit, the other being St. George.

History 
This station opened on July 31, 1884, with the extension of the SIRT from Vanderbilt's Landing (now Clifton) to Tompkinsville.

Station layout
The station is located at grade with an island platform and two tracks. All staircases go up to overpasses at both ends of the station.

Exits
The north entrance leads to Victory Boulevard, where an overpass leads west to Bay Street and east to Joseph H. Lyons Pool. There is a parking lot adjacent to the southbound track at Victory Boulevard. The south entrance leads to Hannah Street. There is a third track adjacent to the southbound track at the southern end of the station; it is part of the Tompkinsville Non-Revenue Repair Shop, which contains barns on both sides of the line and is south of this station. The shop was repaired in the 1990s, with the contract awarded in May 1994 for $1,969,777. As part of the project, a 4,000 square foot addition was made to the facility, the existing freight house was demolished, the interior of the shop building was renovated, and the area in front of the building was paved.

Therefore, the Metropolitan Transportation Authority closed the Victory Boulevard entrance on August 28, 2008. A new $6.9 million station house was built, which included turnstiles for both entering and exiting customers; it opened on January 20, 2010. The Hannah Street entrance on the station's south end is now used only for emergencies.

References

External links

 Hannah Street entrance from Google Maps Street View
 Victory Boulevard entrance from Google Maps Street View
Platform from Google Maps Street View

Staten Island Railway stations
Railway stations in the United States opened in 1884
1884 establishments in New York (state)
Tompkinsville, Staten Island